The Central Singapore Community Development Council is one of five Community Development Councils (CDCs) set up across the Republic of Singapore to aid in local administration of governmental policies and schemes.

Constituencies
As of March 2020, the Central Singapore district covers:

Single Member Constituency (SMC)
Kebun Baru SMC
Marymount SMC
Potong Pasir SMC
Radin Mas SMC
Yio Chu Kang SMC

Group Representation Constituency (GRC)
Ang Mo Kio GRC 
Ang Mo Kio–Hougang
Cheng San–Seletar
Jalan Kayu
Fernvale
Teck Ghee
Bishan-Toa Payoh GRC
Bishan East–Sin Ming
Toa Payoh West–Thomson
Toa Payoh Central
Toa Payoh East
Jalan Besar GRC
Kampong Glam
Kolam Ayer
Kreta Ayer - Kim Seng
Whampoa
Tanjong Pagar GRC
Buona Vista
Henderson - Dawson
Moulmein - Cairnhill
Queenstown
Tanjong Pagar - Tiong Bahru

Mayors
The incumbent Mayor of Central Singapore District is Denise Phua of Jalan Besar GRC since 2014.

External links
 Central Singapore Community Development Council

Districts of Singapore
2001 establishments in Singapore
Organizations established in 2001